The Skandinaviska Aero BHT-1 Beauty is a 1940s Swedish single-seat light monoplane designed by E. Bratt, K.E. Hilfing and B.Törnblom and built by Skandinaviska Aero of Stockholm.

Design
The BHT-1 is a wooden low-wing cantilever monoplane with a retractable tailwheel landing gear. Powered by a  Walter Mikron 4 piston engine it has an enclosed single-seat cockpit. The wings include slotted flaps.

Variants
The BHT-2 was a proposed two-seat development. 
A prototype constant speed propeller was developed for the aircraft using differential between engine oil, and ram air pressure to control pitch.

Specifications

References

1940s Swedish civil utility aircraft
Single-engined tractor aircraft
Low-wing aircraft
Aircraft first flown in 1944